Arnas Šidiškis (born 7 July 1990) is a Lithuanian olympic weightlifter.

Šidiškis represented Lithuania at the 2019 World Championships where he finished in 22nd place. At the 2021 European Weightlifting Championships he finished 10th in 109kg category with total result of 354kg.

In June 2021 it was announced that Šidiškis qualified for 2020 Summer Olympics in Tokyo, Japan. He competed in the men's 109 kg event.

References

External links
 Arnas Šidiškis at the IWF website

1990 births
Living people
Lithuanian male weightlifters
Sportspeople from Klaipėda
Weightlifters at the 2020 Summer Olympics
Olympic weightlifters of Lithuania
21st-century Lithuanian people